FC3 may refer to:
 Far Cry 3, a 2012 video game.
 Release 3 of the Fedora Core Linux distribution.
 1982 FC3, an alternative name for the asteroid 4172 Rochefort
 FC3: an EEG electrode site according to the 10-20 system